Yshai Oliel (born 5 January 2000) is an Israeli tennis player. He was the No. 1 Israeli singles from October 4, 2021, until October 3, 2022.

Oliel is a two-time Junior Orange Bowl champion, having won in 2012 and 2014. He also won the 2016 French Open Boys' Doubles title, with Patrik Rikl. He made it to the finals in the boys' singles at the 2017 Australian Open, where he lost.

Early and personal life
Oliel is originally from Ramla, Israel. He is Jewish and his parents, Avraham and Floret Oliel, are of Sephardic Jewish (Moroccan-Jewish) descent. He is the youngest of their five children.

As a teenager he grew long, shoulder-length hair. However, his sister told him it was getting to be too much and that it was time "to be a man", so he cut his hair and donated it to children undergoing cancer treatment.

Oliel is currently in a relationship with Israeli tennis player Roni Lior.

Junior career
Oliel started playing tennis at the age of 5. From the age of 9 he was a member of the David Squad, a non-profit tennis academy, which identifies the most talented Israeli players and develops them all the way to professional level. Oliel was supported by the David Squad until he turned professional at the age of 19.

He won the Junior Orange Bowl in the 12-and-under singles category in 2012, while Oliel was in 7th grade. He returned at 13 years of age, ranked first in the tournament, to win the 2014 Junior Orange Bowl in the 14-and-under singles category. That made him one of only nine tennis players to win the Junior Orange Bowl championship twice in its 70-year history, which list includes Andy Murray, Jimmy Connors, Jennifer Capriati, and Monica Seles.

As a 15-year-old in 2015, Oliel was ranked  48 among players 18-and-younger.

Oliel, at age 16, won the 2016 French Open Boys' Doubles title with Patrik Rikl of the Czech Republic, defeating Chung Yun-seong and Orlando Luz in the final 6–3, 6–4. Oliel said: "It helped that there were hundreds of Israelis and members of the Jewish community that came along to Roland Garros to cheer me along. I feel very proud to be out there representing Israel." He became the fourth Israeli to win a junior grand slam title, joining Dudi Sela (who won the same title in 2003), Anna Smashnova, and Shahar Pe'er, all of whom went on to become top-30 players.

At the 2016 Junior Boys' singles tournament at the US Open at age 16, after beating No. 2 seed Alex de Minaur of Australia in the second round 4–6, 6–2, 7–6(2), Oliel lost to No. 13 seed Nicola Kuhn of Spain. At the 2016 Junior Boys' doubles tournament at the US Open, Oliel and Zizou Bergs of Belgium made it to the semi-finals, where they lost to ultimate champions Juan Carlos Aguilar and Felipe Meligeni 4–6, 7–6(1), 10–2.

As a 16-year-old in September 2016, Oliel was ranked No. 39 among players 18-and-younger.

He lost to Hungarian Zsombor Piros in the boys' singles final at the 2017 Australian Open, which Oliel reached after beating top seed Yibing Wu 6–4, 3–6, 6–2 in the semifinals. Oliel had hoped to follow in the footsteps of Israeli junior champions Shahar Pe'er, who won the girls' Australian Open in 2004, and Anna Smashnova, who won the girls' French Open in 1991. He became the second Israeli to reach a final at a boys' Grand Slam event, following Noam Behr who lost in the final of the boys' US Open in 1992. The result allowed him to reach the No. 4 place in the Junior rankings.

Professional career

2017–2018
Later in 2017, Oliel continued to slowly discover the professional circuit and made his first appearance in a Challenger tournament, in Sophia Antipolis for the Verrazzano Open. In December 2017, while still 17 years old, he won his first Futures tournament, in Sajur, Israel. With the victory he became the fourth player in the world born in the year 2000 to win a Futures title, joining Félix Auger-Aliassime, Nicola Kuhn, and Thiago Seyboth Wild. Following a few ITF Men's Circuit tournaments played with promising results in his home country (three semi-finals and a win), he was ranked No. 629 at the end of the 2017 ATP season, which constituted the best ranking of his young career. In March 2018, Oliel reached in the finals of an Israel F2 in Ramat HaSharon, Israel, where he fell to Harri Heliövaara. The next month, Oliel beat world #233 Václav Šafránek.

2019–2020: Early success on the Futures and Challenger Tour
In May 2019, Oliel won the M15 Heraklion in Heraklion, Greece, defeating Britain's Lloyd Glasspool in the final, and in June 2019 he won the M15 Netanya in Netanya, Israel with a win in the finals over Gilbert Soares Klier Junior. He won the M15 Kiryat Shmona tournament, in September 2019, held at ITC Kiryat Shmona, defeating Britain's Jack Draper in the final, and the M15 Sajur in Sajur, Israel.

2021: ATP debut, Israeli No. 1 player
Oliel reached a singles ranking of No. 381 on October 4, 2021, which was his career high at the time. With this ranking, he became the highest ranked Israeli tennis player in the world.

Oliel made his ATP debut at the 2021 St. Petersburg Open after receiving a wildcard into the main draw. He played John Millman in the first round, but was defeated 6–1, 6–1.

2022: Second ATP tournament
In July 2022, Oliel reached the finals of the Marburg, (Germany) Clay M25. On 8 August 2022, he reached a career-high of world No. 305 in singles.

Oliel received a wildcard to his home tournament, the Tel Aviv Open. He lost to qualifier compatriot Edan Leshem in straight sets.

National representation

Davis Cup
In March 2022, Oliel participated in the Davis Cup representing Israel against South Africa. Oliel played two singles matches and defeated world #34 Lloyd Harris and Ruan Roelofse. Oliel's win over Harris marked the biggest victory in the Israeli's career. Israel went on to defeat South Africa by a score of 3-1 and earned a promotion to the World Group I of the Davis Cup.

Playing style
Oliel has been noted for his grace, timing, and tenacity. He has a forehand with a good deal of spin, a stable two-handed backhand, a good volley with excellent touch, and he moves well on the court and reads situations well. Former French Open and Wimbledon women's doubles champion Angela Buxton compared his style to that of Roger Federer, noting that he does not "force or muscle the ball".

Junior Grand Slam finals

Singles: 1 (1 runner-up)

Doubles: 1 (1 title)

ATP Challenger and ITF Futures finals

Singles: 15 (7–8)

Doubles: 1 (0–1)

See also
 List of select Jewish tennis players

References

External links
 
 
 

2000 births
Living people
Jewish Israeli sportspeople
Jewish tennis players
Tennis in Israel
Israeli male tennis players
French Open junior champions
Israeli people of Moroccan-Jewish descent
Sportspeople from Ramla
Grand Slam (tennis) champions in boys' doubles
Israeli Sephardi Jews
Israeli Mizrahi Jews